Juńczyk - is a Polish coat of arms. It was used by several szlachta families in the times of the Polish–Lithuanian Commonwealth.

History

Blazon

In the red field, a silver double cross torn into a mustache. Gem: five ostrich feathers.

Variety:

Junczyk II (In the red field, a Latin cross torn into a mustache, silver. Jewel: three ostrich feathers.)

Juńczyk II coat of arms 

 Boguszewicz, Bolbas, Gołub

Gallery

See also
 Polish heraldry
 Heraldic family
 List of Polish nobility coats of arms

External links 
  
  

Polish coats of arms